Ulysse Delsaux (born 22 September 1997 in Troyes) is a French professional racing driver who currently competes in the NASCAR Whelen Euro Series, driving the No. 10 Chevrolet Camaro for RDV Competition in both the EuroNASCAR PRO and the EuroNASCAR 2 class. He is a one-time champion in the Euro Series, having won the EuroNASCAR 2 championship in 2018.

Racing career

Delsaux made his kart racing debut in the Ile-De-France Minikart Championship at the age of nine, two years after his father Emmanuel gave him his first kart.  Early in his career, he competed in the regional championships and won the regional title in 2011, allowing him to move to international championships before a crash forced Delsaux to stop competing in karting.

In 2013, Delsaux switched to stock car racing and joined the NASCAR Whelen Euro Series Developmental program. He was given to opportunity to make his racing debut in a street stock race at Bowman-Gray Stadium. In 2014, he made his debut in the NASCAR Whelen Euro Series, signing a contract to compete in the Elite 2 class with RDV Competition. He finished 9th in the championship with a best finish of fourth in the second race at Umbria.

Delsaux was transferred to the No. 3 team as the Elite 2 partner of Frédéric Gabillon for the 2015 season. He finished the season in 7th in the championship with 1 podium finish in the second race at Tours, two Top-5 finishes, and a total of 10 Top-10 finishes. In 2016, he made his K&N East debut for Precision Performance Motorsports during the season-opening round at New Smyrna. He qualified in 19th before finishing in 28th after he was involved in a crash on lap 50. He also moved up to the Elite 1 class on the same year, driving the No. 31 RDV Competition Ford Mustang for all twelve races of the season. He finished 9th in points with 6 Top-10 finishes.

The next season, 2017, saw Delsaux move back to Elite 2 class to once again partner Gabillon in the No. 3 RDV Competition team. He scored an emotional first Euro Series career victory at Valencia, winning by 3.5 seconds over eventual championship winner Thomas Ferrando in the Sunday race. Afterward, Delsaux was joined by fellow drivers, spotters, and NASCAR officials to celebrate in the victory lane. Delsaux would finish the season in fourth, scoring a total of 1 win, 6 podiums, and 10 Top-10 finishes.

In 2018, Delsaux once again competed in Elite 2 in the No. 3 RDV Competition team. He swept both races at Tours Speedway to claim his first victories in an oval. Leading the championship coming to the double points-paying playoff rounds at Hockenheim and Zolder, Delsaux started his playoff run with his third victory at the season at the Saturday race in Hockenheim before a puncture on the final lap of the Sunday race denied him of an opportunity to sweep the weekend. At the season finale round in Zolder, Delsaux was able to recover from an early accident to finish in second on the first race before being crowned as the Elite 2 champion after finishing third in the second race. Delsaux finished the season just 6 points ahead of Florian Venturi in the championship with 3 wins, 6 podiums, and 10 Top-10 finishes.

Delsaux returned to the Elite 1 class in 2019 to replace Bobby Labonte in the second RDV team. Delsaux would run the No. 36 car for 2019. He stated that the No. 36 is an inversion of 63, which serves as a tribute to both his father Emmanuel, who was born in 1963, and Jim Clark, who won his first Formula One title in 1963. He finished 9th in points with 1 Top-5 and 4 Top-10 finishes.

For the 2020 season, Delsaux is scheduled to race in both the EuroNASCAR PRO and the EuroNASCAR 2 class. He is also going to run the No. 10 instead of the No. 36, stating that he wants to run the number as a way to represent Aube, his home department.

Personal life

Delsaux was diagnosed with high-functioning autism early in his life. He had trouble communicating with others as a child and was unable to talk until he was 5 years old. , he still had to make a monthly visit with a doctor in Paris. He has said that his aspirations in racing "is the demonstration that there is no obstacle you cannot overcome with hard work, passion, and a strong will to succeed". His childhood idols include Jeff Gordon and Jim Clark.

He is known to be a fan of anime and his helmet currently features an illustration of Sinon from Sword Art Online on the back of his helmet.

Complete motorsports results

NASCAR

Whelen Euro Series - EuroNASCAR PRO

(key) Bold - Pole position awarded by fastest qualifying time (in Race 1) or by previous race's fastest lap (in Race 2). Italics - Fastest lap. * – Most laps led.  ^ – Most positions gained.

Whelen Euro Series - EuroNASCAR 2

K&N Pro Series East

(key) (Bold – Pole position awarded by qualifying time. Italics – Pole position earned by points standings or practice time. * – Most laps led.)

 Season still in progress

References

External links
Official website of Ulysse Delsaux

1997 births
Living people
French racing drivers
NASCAR drivers
Sportspeople from Troyes
People on the autism spectrum